The prehistoric landmark of Stonehenge is distinctive and famous enough to have been frequently referenced in popular culture. The landmark has become a symbol of British culture and history, owing to its distinctiveness and its long history of being portrayed in art, literature, and advertising campaigns; and in more recent media formats such as television, film, and computer games.  This is in part because the arrangement of standing stones topped with lintels is unique: not just in the British Isles, but in the world.

Art and mythology

The interest in 'ancient' Britain can be traced back to the sixteenth and seventeenth centuries, following the pioneering work of the likes of William Camden, John Aubrey and John Evelyn. The rediscovery of Britain's past was also tied up in the nation's emerging sense of importance as an international power. Antiquarians and archaeologists, notably William Stukeley, were conducting excavations of megalithic sites, including Stonehenge and the nearby Avebury. Their findings caused considerable debate on the history and meaning of such sites and the earliest depictions reflected a search for a mystical explanation.

Earlier explanations, including the view proposed by Inigo Jones in 1630, that Stonehenge was built by the Romans such was its sophistication and beauty, were disproved in the late seventeenth century, when it was proven that Stonehenge was the work of indigenous neolithic peoples. From this period onwards, artists made images of barrows, standing stones, and excavated objects which increasingly drew on highly imaginative ideas about the prehistoric people who created them. These helped to create the image of Britain that a broadening audience was becoming aware of through illustrated books, maps and prints. Poets and other writers deepened the impact of this visual material by imagining ancient pasts and mythologising the distant roots of the growing British Empire. Debates about British ancestry and national identity saw a growing conviction that the British were an ancient people and that the newly named 'United Kingdom' might find greater harmony through searching for a common past. For the English, this past was to be found in the West, starting around Stonehenge and stretching into the ancient Celtic regions of Wales and Cornwall.

During the early nineteenth century it was artists such as John Constable and J. M. W. Turner who helped to make the megalithic sites a part of the popular imagination and understanding of Britain's past. The philosopher Edmund Burke proposed the idea of the 'sublime' sense as being evoked by 'feelings of danger and terror, obscurity and power, in art as well as life'. This was already a feature of artistic and literary works of the period and provided the theoretical basis for a growing appreciation of desolate landscapes and ancient ruins. For these reasons, Stonehenge became of particular interest for artists. Burke himself wrote "Stonehenge, neither for disposition nor ornament, has anything admirable; but those huge rude masses of stone, set end on end, and piled high on each other, turn the mind on the immense force necessary for such a work."

The very nature of the barren Wiltshire landscape and Salisbury Plain became particularly notable for the apparently miraculous powers that created Stonehenge. William Wordsworth wrote

Pile of Stone-henge!  So proud to hint yet keepThy secrets, thou lov'st to stand and hearThe plain resounding to the whirlwind's sweepInmate of lonesome Nature's endless year.
 
Turner's and Constable's paintings were arranged for a romantic effect and deviated from the actual state of the stones. Turner particularly added stones that were not there in reality and those that were, were incorrect in their dimensions. Throughout the nineteenth century, a new motive emerged in the depictions of Stonehenge, that of an anti-pagan approach, with paintings by the likes of William Overend Geller, with his painting The Druid's Sacrifice in 1832. In the novel Tess of the d'Urbervilles by Thomas Hardy, the main character, Tess, is captured by the police at Stonehenge, the 'heathen' nature of the setting being used to highlight the character's temperament.

The image of Stonehenge became adapted in the twentieth century by those wishing to advertise using a monument viewed as a symbol of Britain. The Royal Navy exploited this sense of identification by naming an S-class destroyer and one of their S-class submarines . The Shell Oil Company commissioned the artist Edward McKnight Kauffer to paint a series of posters during the interwar period, to be used to encourage tourism by car owners. Stonehenge was one of those depicted.

Stonehenge has also been depicted in less solemn contexts. The 1984 American mockumentary This Is Spinal Tap features a comically-undersized model of the landmark as a prop for the rock group's performances. Norwegian comedy duo Ylvis released their song "Stonehenge" in 2011, in which they ponder Stonehenge's mysterious origins. 

In 2022, Stonehenge was illuminated to pay tribute to Queen Elizabeth II on the occasion of her Platinum Jubilee. English Heritage stated they "wanted to show different aspects of the Queen, of her personality, of her interests and just really show what a special lady she is." The display is just one of many ways in which the UK came together to mark 70 years of the Queen sitting on the throne.

References

David Dimbleby (2005), A Picture of Britain, Tate Publishing, 
James McClintock (2006), The Stonehenge Companion, English Heritage 
Evan Hadingham (1976), Circles and Standing Stones, William Heinemann Ltd.
Julian Richards (2004), Stonehenge: A History in Photographs, English Heritage 
Aubrey Burl (1979), Prehistoric Avebury, Yale University Press 

United Kingdom in popular culture
Stonehenge